Helenite, also known as Mount St. Helens obsidian, emerald obsidianite, and ruby obsidianite, is an artificial glass made from the fused volcanic rock dust from Mount St. Helens and marketed as a gemstone. Helenite was first created accidentally after the eruption of Mount St. Helens in 1980. Workers from the Weyerhaeuser Timber Company were attempting to salvage equipment damaged after the volcanic eruption. Using acetylene torches, they noticed that the intense heat was melting the nearby volcanic ash and rock and turning it a greenish color. The silica, aluminium, iron, and trace amounts of chromium and copper present in the rocks and ash in the area, combined with the heat of the torches, transformed the volcanic particles into a compound that would be later commercially replicated as helenite.

As word of the discovery spread, jewelry companies took note and began to find ways to reproduce the helenite. Although helenite and obsidian are both forms of glass, helenite differs from obsidian in that it is man-made. The stone has been marketed by the jewelry industry because of its emerald-like color, good refractive index, although its durability is low. It has a hardness of just 5 to 5 ½ and chips about as easily as obsidian or window glass. It is best used in earrings, pendants, brooches, and other types of jewelry where it will not encounter impact or abrasion. Even in these uses it should be considered to be a very delicate stone. If it is used as a ring stone, the facet edges will be easily abraded, the faces will be easily scratched, and the stone might be chipped with even a slight impact. It is seen as an inexpensive alternative to naturally-occurring green gemstones, such as emerald and peridot. Helenite can also come in various red, green and blue varieties.

See also
 Goldstone (glass)
 Olivine

References

External links
Glossary: H, Illustrated Dictionary of Jewelry at enchantedlearning.com
Helenite at Geology.com 
Helenite Gemstone & Information at JTV.com

Gemstones
Glass
Mount St. Helens